Caorso Nuclear Power Plant was a nuclear power plant at Caorso in Italy. It featured a single Boiling Water Reactor, a BWR 4 with a Mark II-Containment from General Electric,  with an electrical net output of 860 MW, used low-enriched uranium as fuel, was moderated and cooled by normal light water.

It operated from 1981 until 1990, when it was closed following the referendum of November 1987. It was by far the most modern and in terms of capacity biggest nuclear power plant to go online in Italy. The Italian nuclear decommissioning agency SOGIN started the process of decommissioning the plant on January 2014.

Gallery

External links

 Nuclear power in Italy at the WNA site.

References

Nuclear power stations using boiling water reactors
Former nuclear power stations in Italy